John Rungsted Sørensen (born 5 October 1934) is a Danish sprint canoer who competed in the early 1960s. He won the bronze medal in the C-2 1000 m event at the 1964 Summer Olympics in Tokyo.

References
Sports-reference.com profile (As John Rungsted Sorensen)

1934 births
Canoeists at the 1964 Summer Olympics
Danish male canoeists
Living people
Olympic canoeists of Denmark
Olympic bronze medalists for Denmark
Olympic medalists in canoeing

Medalists at the 1964 Summer Olympics